Hoodia triebneri is a species of plant in the family Apocynaceae. It is endemic to Namibia.  Its natural habitat is rocky areas, especially underneath Acacia trees and below ridges.

Description
Hoodia triebneri is shrub-like, growing up to 0.3 meters tall and half a meter wide. It has about ten to thirty erect, slender stems with strong spines. Flowers are very small, 1 to 1.5 centimeters in diameter and nearly black or dark maroon in color. The flowers grow in clusters of 4 to 10 each and are foul-smelling.

References

Endemic flora of Namibia
triebneri
Least concern plants
Taxonomy articles created by Polbot